Shepherds Bush Empire is the second live album by American blues rock musician Joe Bonamassa. Produced by Kevin Shirley, it was released on December 11, 2007 by J&R Adventures.

Track listing

References

2007 live albums
Joe Bonamassa albums
Albums produced by Kevin Shirley
Shepherd's Bush